Geophis semidoliatus, also known as the  coral earth snake, is a snake of the colubrid family. It is found in Mexico.

References

Geophis
Snakes of North America
Reptiles of Mexico
Endemic fauna of Mexico
Reptiles described in 1854
Taxa named by André Marie Constant Duméril
Taxa named by Gabriel Bibron
Taxa named by Auguste Duméril